The episodes of the Miracle Girls anime are based on the manga series of the same name written by Nami Akimoto. They are directed by Hiroko Tokita and Takashi Anno, and produced by Japan Taps. The plot of the episodes follow Tomomi and Mikage Matsunaga, telepathic twins with the power to teleport whenever they are together, and their day-to-day lives living with psychic powers alongside typical school and teenage problems.

Three pieces of theme music are used for the episodes: two opening themes and one closing theme. The opening theme for the first 29 episodes is "KISU no Tochuu de Namida ga" by GARDEN. The opening theme for the last 22 episodes is "Koi no Mirai" by GARDEN, and the ending theme for all 51 episodes is "Futari ja Nakya Dame na no" by Dio.

Episode list

Notes
Due to a missing translation, the summaries for episodes 15-28 and 33-36 may be lacking important information.

References

External links
Miracle Girls at TOKYOPOP.

Miracle Girls

es:Gemelas Milagrosas
ko:요술소녀
it:È un po' magia per Terry e Maggie
ja:ミラクル☆ガールズ